Get Ready! is the second album by British band Roachford, released in 1991 on Columbia Records. The album's title track reached number 22 in the UK Singles Chart.

Track listing
All tracks written by Andrew Roachford.

Charts

References

External links
Get Ready! at Discogs

1991 albums
Roachford albums
Rock albums by British artists
Columbia Records albums